Retinoblastoma-binding protein 8 is a protein that in humans is encoded by the RBBP8 gene.

Function 

The protein encoded by this gene is a ubiquitously expressed nuclear protein. It is found among several proteins that bind directly to retinoblastoma protein, which regulates cell proliferation. This protein complexes with transcriptional co-repressor CTBP. It is also associated with BRCA1 and is thought to modulate the functions of BRCA1 in transcriptional regulation, DNA repair, and/or cell cycle checkpoint control. It is suggested that this gene may itself be a tumor suppressor acting in the same pathway as BRCA1. Three transcript variants encoding two different isoforms have been found for this gene. More transcript variants exist, but their full-length natures have not been determined.

Interactions
RBBP8 has been shown to interact with:

 ATM, 
 BRCA1,
 CTBP1, 
 LMO4, 
 RB1, 
 RBL1, 
 RBL2,  and
 SIAH1

References

Further reading